Stafford County Public Schools is a Virginia school division that serves the Stafford County Area. Its current superintendent is Thomas Taylor and has 30,086 students currently enrolled in its 17 elementary schools, 8 middle schools and 6 high schools.
A 6th high school will be completed by August 2026.

The district serves most of the county. However places on Marine Corps Base Quantico are zoned to Department of Defense Education Activity (DoDEA) schools,

Schools

Elementary schools
Kate Waller Barrett Elementary School

Margaret Brent Elementary School

Anthony Burns Elementary School

Conway Elementary School

Falmouth Elementary School

Ferry Farm Elementary School

Garrisonville Elementary School

Grafton Village Elementary School

Hampton Oaks Elementary School

Hartwood Elementary School

Anne E. Moncure Elementary School

Park Ridge Elementary School

Rockhill Elementary School

Rocky Run Elementary School

Stafford Elementary School

Widewater Elementary School

Winding Creek Elementary School

Middle schools
Dixon-Smith Middle School

 Fredericksburg, Virginia
 Principal: Mr. Andrew Bathke 
 Mascot: Bulldogs
 Named after Donald B. Dixon and Lyle R. Smith

Edward E. Drew Middle School

 Falmouth, Virginia
 Principal:  Ms. Amy Ivory 
 Mascot: Rams
 Named after Assistant Principal Edward E. Drew Jr.

T. Benton Gayle Middle School

 Fredericksburg, Virginia
 Principal:  Ms. Katie Werner 
 Mascot: Panthers
 Named after Superintendent T. Benton Gayle

Shirley C. Heim Middle School

 Stafford, Virginia
 Principal: Mr.Eric Underhill 
 Mascot: Timberwolves
 Named after Assistant Superintendent for Finance and Technology for Stafford County Public Schools Shirley C. Heim 

H. H. Poole Middle School

 Stafford, Virginia
 Principal: Mr. Robert Bingham 
 Mascot: Mustangs
 Named after educator Henry Harrison Poole 

Stafford Middle School

 Stafford, Virginia
 Principal: Mr. Scott Elchenko 
 Mascot: Spartans

Rodney E. Thompson Middle School

 Stafford, Virginia
 Principal: Mr. Mike Archambault 
 Mascot: Jaguars
 Named after educator Rodney E. Thompson 

Andrew G. Wright Middle School

 Stafford, Virginia
 Principal: Mr. William Boatwright 
 Mascot: Tigers
 Named after Stafford County Public School Superintendent Andrew Graham Wright

High schools
Brooke Point High School

 Stafford, Virginia
 Principal: Mr. Tim Rogers
 Mascot: Blackhawks

Colonial Forge High School

 Stafford, Virginia
 Principal: Mr. Greg Daniel
 Mascot: Eagles

Mountain View High School

 Stafford, Virginia
 Principal: Dr. James D. Stemple Jr.
 Mascot: Wildcats

North Stafford High School

 Stafford, Virginia
 Principal: Dr. Daniel Hornick
 Mascot: Wolverines

Stafford High School

 Fredericksburg, Virginia
 Principal: Mr. Allen Hicks
 Mascot: Indians

References

Stafford County Public Schools
County government agencies in Virginia
School divisions in Virginia